The women's 4 × 100 metres relay at the 2006 European Athletics Championships were held at the Ullevi on 12 and 13 August.

Medalists

Schedule

Results

Heats 
First three in each heat (Q) and the next two fastest (q) advance to the final.

Final

External links 
 Results

Relay 4 x 100
Relays at the European Athletics Championships
2006 in women's athletics